Osbaston may refer to the following places:

Osbaston, Leicestershire, England
Osbaston, Monmouth, Monmouthshire, Wales
Osbaston, Oswestry, Shropshire, England
Osbaston, Telford, Shropshire, England